Booby is an island in Seychelles, lying north of Praslin and south of Aride Island. It has an area of 2.3 hectares.
Booby Island is a high granite rock, densely covered with tropical vegetation. The name of the island was given through numerous flocks of boobies that nest on the island. The island is uninhabited.

Tourism
The island is visited by tourists for its wide variety of underwater creatures like fish, sharks and rays.

Image gallery

References

External links 
 Official Booby Island Guide

Islands of Grand'Anse Praslin